Zsolt Antal (born 21 March 1972) is a Romanian cross-country skier. He competed at the 1994, 1998, 2002 and the 2006 Winter Olympics.

References

1972 births
Living people
Romanian male cross-country skiers
Olympic cross-country skiers of Romania
Cross-country skiers at the 1994 Winter Olympics
Cross-country skiers at the 1998 Winter Olympics
Cross-country skiers at the 2002 Winter Olympics
Cross-country skiers at the 2006 Winter Olympics
People from Gheorgheni